The Berlin Iron Bridge Company was a Berlin, Connecticut company that built iron bridges and buildings that were supported by iron. It is credited as the architect of numerous bridges and buildings now listed on the U.S. National Register of Historic Places. It eventually became part of the American Bridge Company.

History 

The Berlin Iron Bridge Company began in 1868 as the Corrugated Metal Company, a branch of tinware firm Roys and Wilcox, which is now part of Roper Whitney. Originally producing roofing and shutters, the company became involved in roof trusses. In 1878, under Samuel C. Wilcox, the company purchased the rights to the "parabolic" (lenticular truss) bridge patent from William Douglas. Douglas became treasurer and executive manager of the company. In 1885 he received another patent, and the company name was changed to Berlin Iron Bridge Company.

The Berlin Iron Bridge Company constructed hundreds of bridges across the eastern United States, until 1900, when the company was acquired by the American Bridge Company.

Berlin Steel 

Almost immediately after its acquisition by the American Bridge Company, three executives from the Berlin Iron Bridge Company split from American Bridge and formed their own company, the Berlin Construction Company. The new company continued in the path of the Berlin Iron Bridge Company and continued building bridges until the 1930s. In 1962 it was renamed to the Berlin Steel Construction Company, and still exists today. Several of their bridges have also been listed on the National Register of Historic Places.

Bridges

 Mattabesset River Bridge (c.1880s or 1890s), abandoned lenticular pony-truss in Connecticut spanning the Mattabesset River between Cromwell and Berlin
Berlin Bridge (1880) over Webutuck Creek, a lenticular truss bridge manufactured in 1880 and shipped to the area for installation by local residents, NRHP-listed
Bardwell's Ferry Bridge (1882), a lenticular truss bridge over the Deerfield River, Conway, Massachusetts, NRHP-listed
Sheffield Street Bridge (1884), carries Sheffield Street over Hancock Brook in Waterbury, Connecticut, NRHP-listed
Interlaken Mill Bridge (1885), Rhode Island, built 1885 spanning the Pawtuxet River, NRHP-listed
Hadley Parabolic Bridge (1885), only survivor of only three iron semi-deck lenticular truss bridges to have been built (in New York State or in the world?), CR 1, Hadley, NY, NRHP-listed
Interlaken Mill Bridge (1885), spanning the Pawtuxet River at Arkwright, Coventry, RI, NRHP-listed
Golden Hill Bridge (c.1885), only known surviving bridge to implement modifications to the pony truss design patented by William O. Douglas in 1885, Golden Hill Rd. over the Housatonic River, Lee, MA, NRHP-listed
Glen Falls Bridge (1886), Brunswick Ave. over the Moosup River, Plainfield, CT, NRHP-listed
Raymondville Parabolic Bridge (1886), a lenticular truss bridge spanning the Raquette River, Raymondville, NY, NRHP-listed
South Washington Street Parabolic Bridge (1886), a lenticular truss bridge, S. Washington St., Binghamton, New York, NRHP-listed
Ashland Mill Bridge (1886), over the Pachaug River, near Ashland St., Griswold, CT, formerly NRHP-listed
Douglas & Jarvis Patent Parabolic Truss Iron Bridge (1887), Rte. 2 over the Missisquoi River, Highgate Falls, VT, NRHP-listed
Pineground Bridge (1887), 0.15 mi. E of NH 28 on Depot Rd., Chichester, NH, NRHP-listed
Boardman's Bridge (1888), Boardman Rd. over the Housatonic River, NW of New Milford, CT, NRHP-listed
Main Street Bridge (1888), now a footbridge only, carried Main St. over the Rippowam River, Stamford, CT, NRHP-listed
Melrose Road Bridge (1888), Melrose Rd. over the Scantic River, East Windsor, CT, NRHP-listed
Ouaquaga Lenticular Truss Bridge (1888), a lenticular truss bridge over the Susquehanna River, Ouaquaga, NY, NRHP-listed
Swing Bridge (1888), over the Ausable River, between Clinton and S. Ausable Sts., Keeseville, NY, NRHP-listed
Town Line Bridge (1888), located in the town of Taylor in Cortland County, New York, NRHP-listed
Minortown Road Bridge (1890), Minortown Rd. over the Nonewaug River, Woodbury, CT, NRHP-listed
Walton Bridge (c. 1890), Dr. Ray Rd. access over the Ausable River, Keene, NY, NRHP-listed
Waterville Bridge (1890), moved in 1985, now brings the Appalachian Trail over Swatara Creek, Swatara Gap, PA, NRHP-listed
Red Bridge (1891), near Oregon Rd. over the Quinnipiac River, Meriden, CT, NRHP-listed
Main Street Bridge (1891), spanning the Tankerhoosen River in Talcottville (Vernon), CT
Rice Farm Road Bridge (1892), Town Hwy. 62, off VT 30, Dummerston, VT, NRHP-listed
Turn-of-River Bridge (1892), Old N. Stamford Rd. at the Rippowam River, Stamford, CT.  A small lenticular pony truss bridge, NRHP-listed
Lover's Leap Bridge (1895), a wrought-iron lenticular truss bridge over the Housatonic River, S of New Milford on Pumpkin Hill Rd., New Milford, CT, NRHP-listed
Town Bridge (1895), over the Farmington River, Canton, CT, NRHP-listed
Neshanic Station Lenticular Truss Bridge (1896), over the South Branch Raritan River, Neshanic Station, New Jersey, NRHP-listed
Several bridges in San Antonio, TX, including the Brackenridge Park Bridge (1890), the Augusta Street Bridge (1890), and the Crockett Street Bridge (1891).

Buildings

Dry Dock Engine Works Machine Shop (1892), novel early example of building with load-bearing steel frame with non-load-bearing brick curtain walls, Detroit, Michigan
Providence Gas Company Purifier House (1900), 200 Allens Ave., Providence, RI, NRHP-listed
Beaman and Smith Company Mill (1898), steel-framed brick building at 20 Gordon Ave., Providence, RI, NRHP-listed
Capewell Horse Nail Company (1903), 60-70 Popieluszko St., Hartford, CT, NRHP-listed (Berlin Iron Works)

References

External links
 Berlin Iron Bridge Company  web presentation
 The Berlin Iron Bridge Co. Catalogue 1889 Kenneth Franzheim II Rare Books Room ,William R. Jenkins Architecture and Art Library, University of Houston Digital Library.

Companies based in Hartford County, Connecticut